William Govett Romaine, CB (1815 – 29 April 1893) was an English barrister, civil servant and colonial administrator. His name in early life was William Govett: his father was Robert Govett, vicar of Staines, who changed his surname to Romaine in 1827.

Romaine matriculated at Trinity College, Cambridge in 1833, graduating B.A. 1837 and M.A. 1859. He was called to the bar in 1839 and became a deputy judge-advocate in the army during the Crimean War.

In 1857, Romaine was appointed Second Secretary (i.e. Permanent Secretary) to the Admiralty and served in that office until he was appointed Judge-Advocate-General in India in 1869. He left the office in 1873. From 1876 to 1879, he was a member of the Egyptian Conseil du Trésor and served for some of that time as comptroller-general of finances.

References 

1815 births
1893 deaths
English civil servants
English barristers
Alumni of Trinity College, Cambridge
Companions of the Order of the Bath